Imri Ganiel (born 8 January 1992) is an Israeli swimmer.

Biography
Imri Ganiel was born in Beersheba and grew up in Omer. Ganiel started swimming at the age of 8 and has competed in swimming since the age of 12. He is the son of Amir Ganiel, a former Israeli swimming champion.

Sports career
Ganiel is the Israeli national record holder in the 100-meter breaststroke with a time of 1:00.26 minutes, which he broke in the final of the European Championships. At the 2012 Summer Olympics, he competed in the Men's 100 metre breaststroke, finishing in 32nd place in the heats, failing to reach the semifinals.

See also
Sport in Israel
List of Israeli records in swimming

References

External links
 

Israeli male swimmers
Living people
Olympic swimmers of Israel
Swimmers at the 2012 Summer Olympics
Male breaststroke swimmers
Swimmers at the 2010 Summer Youth Olympics
Sportspeople from Beersheba
Year of birth missing (living people)